The 2010 season of the 3. divisjon, the fourth highest association football league for men in Norway.

Between 22 and 26 games (depending on group size) were played in 24 groups, with 3 points given for wins and 1 for draws. Twelve teams were promoted to the 2. divisjon through playoffs.

Unusually many teams were relegated this season, since the 3. divisjon was streamlined to only 12 groups beginning in 2011.

Tables 

Oslo 1
Nesodden – won playoff
Bærum 2
Jutul
Asker 2
Holmlia
Lommedalen
Hauger – relegated
Sagene – relegated
Frognerparken – relegated
Langhus – relegated
Klemetsrud – relegated
Lyn 2 – pulled team

Oslo 2
Korsvoll – lost playoff
Bøler
Røa
Kjelsås 2
Nordstrand
Manglerud Star 2
Fagerborg – relegated
Oldenborg – relegated
KFUM 2 – relegated
Bygdø Monolitten – relegated
Oppsal – relegated
Øvrevoll Hosle – pulled team

Oslo 3
Hasle-Løren – won playoff
Grorud
Ullern
Vestli
Follo 2
Frigg 2
Skeid 2 – relegated
Grüner – relegated
Årvoll – relegated
Rommen – relegated
Huk – relegated
Kolbotn – relegated

Akershus
Lillestrøm 2 – lost playoff
Lørenskog 2
Strømmen 2
Høland
Fjellhamar
Skedsmo
Funnefoss/Vormsund
Skjetten – relegated
Hauerseter – relegated
Sørumsand – relegated
Gjelleråsen – relegated
Åkrene – relegated
Gjerdrum – relegated
Rælingen – relegated

Indre Østland 1
Gjøvik FF – lost playoff
Ottestad
Ham-Kam 2
Kolbu/KK
Nordre Land
Stange
Raufoss 2 – relegated
Redalen – relegated
Gran – relegated
Valdres 2 – relegated
Søndre Land – relegated
Vind – relegated

Indre Østland 2
Elverum – won playoff
Flisa
Moelven
Nybergsund 2
Kongsvinger 2
Eidskog
Lillehammer 2 – relegated
Sander – relegated
Follebu – relegated
Hamar – relegated
Ringsaker – relegated
Løten – relegated

Buskerud
Jevnaker – won playoff
Birkebeineren
Hønefoss 2
Kongsberg
Mjøndalen 2
Modum
Drammen – relegated
Vestfossen – relegated
Åssiden – relegated
Konnerud – relegated
Svelvik – relegated
ROS – relegated

Østfold
Kvik Halden – won playoff
Sprint-Jeløy
Drøbak/Frogn
Fredrikstad 2
Østsiden
Trosvik
Askim – relegated
Mysen – relegated
Moss 2 – relegated
Sarpsborg 2 – relegated
Rakkestad – relegated
Borgar – relegated
Trøgstad/Båstad – relegated
Selbak – relegated

Vestfold
Sandefjord 2
Eik-Tønsberg – lost playoff
Larvik Turn
Tønsberg FK
Flint
FK Tønsberg 2
Runar – relegated
Husøy & Foynland – relegated
Fram Larvik 2 – relegated
Falk – relegated
Nøtterøy – relegated
Sandar – pulled team

Telemark
Skarphedin – lost playoff
Herkules
Notodden 2
Tollnes
Pors Grenland 2
Urædd
Odd 3
Ulefoss – relegated
Kjapp – relegated
Gvarv – relegated
Stathelle og Omegn – relegated
Sannidal – relegated
Brevik – relegated
Skotfoss – relegated

Agder
Mandalskameratene – won playoff
Jerv
Trauma (-> Arendal Fotball)
Lyngdal
Flekkefjord
Søgne
Grane (-> Arendal Fotball)
Giv Akt – relegated
Våg – relegated
Gimletroll – relegated
Birkenes – relegated
Donn – relegated
Randesund – relegated
Farsund – relegated

Rogaland 1
Viking 2 – won playoff
Egersund
Klepp
Bryne 2
Hinna
Vardeneset
Vaulen – relegated
Hana – relegated
Frøyland – relegated
Eiger – relegated
Havørn – relegated
Ålgård 2 – relegated
Varhaug – relegated
Riska – relegated

Rogaland 2
Staal Jørpeland – lost playoff
Sola
Haugesund 2
Sandnes Ulf 2
Brodd
Åkra
Skjold
Vedavåg Karmøy – relegated
Randaberg 2 – relegated
Avaldsnes – relegated
Stavanger 2 – relegated
Sandved – relegated
Buøy – relegated
Nord – pulled team

Hordaland 1
Austevoll – won playoff
Sotra
Tertnes
Løv-Ham 2
Bjarg
Askøy
Varegg – relegated
Hovding – relegated
Vestsiden-Askøy – relegated
Nordhordland – relegated
Lyngbø – relegated
Hald – relegated

Hordaland 2
Voss – lost playoff
Fyllingen
Arna-Bjørnar
Brann 2
Øystese
Os 2 – relegated
Odda – relegated
Baune – relegated
Vadmyra – relegated
Smørås – relegated
Norheimsund – relegated
Bergen Nord – relegated

Sogn og Fjordane
Tornado Måløy – lost playoff
Stryn
Eid
Årdal
Fjøra
Florø
Dale – relegated
Sogndal 2 – relegated
Sandane – relegated
Vik – relegated
Jølster – relegated
Høyang – relegated

Sunnmøre
Herd – won playoff
Bergsøy
Volda
Hødd 2
Brattvåg
Stranda
Hareid – relegated
Valder – relegated
Rollon – relegated
Norborg – relegated
Spjelkavik – relegated
Godøy – relegated

Nordmøre og Romsdal
Sunndal – lost playoff
Træff
Averøykameratene
Elnesvågen/Omegn
Surnadal
Eidsvåg
Kristiansund FK – relegated
Dahle – relegated
Kristiansund 2 – relegated
Rival – relegated
Molde 3 – relegated
Åndalsnes – relegated

Trøndelag 1
Tiller – won playoff
Buvik
KIL/Hemne
Frøya
Strindheim 2
Charlottenlund
Tynset – relegated
Kattem – relegated
Heimdal – relegated
Røros – relegated
Byåsen 2 – relegated
Orkla – relegated

Trøndelag 2
Stjørdals-Blink – lost playoff
NTNUI
Rosenborg 3
Vuku
Namsos
Verdal
Tangmoen – relegated
Malvik – relegated
Remyra – relegated
Neset – relegated
Steinkjer 2 – relegated
Selbu – relegated

Nordland
Stålkameratene – lost playoff
Bodø/Glimt 2
Innstranden
Sandnessjøen
Mosjøen
Fauske/Sprint – relegated
Steigen – relegated
Tverlandet – relegated
Brønnøysund – relegated
Herøy/Dønna – relegated
Meløy – relegated
Grand Bodø – relegated

Hålogaland
Mjølner – won playoff
Sortland
Morild
Lofoten
Landsås
Skånland – relegated
Medkila – relegated
Grovfjord – relegated
Hardhaus – relegated
Melbo – relegated
Ballstad – relegated
Leknes – relegated

Troms
Skarp – won playoff
Lyngen/Karnes
Fløya
Salangen
Finnsnes
Tromsdalen 2
Ishavsbyen
Senja 2 – relegated
Skjervøy – relegated
Tromsø 3 – relegated
Bardufoss og Omegn – relegated
Laksvatn – relegated

Finnmark
Kirkenes – lost playoff
Bossekop
Porsanger
Hammerfest
Norild
Tverrelvdalen – relegated
Sørøy/Glimt – relegated
Alta 2 – relegated
Nordkinn – relegated
Honningsvåg – relegated
Kautokeino – relegated
Bjørnevatn – relegated

Playoffs

References
NIFS

Norwegian Third Division seasons
4
Norway
Norway